Kalai Kovil is a 1964 Indian Tamil-language musical film written and directed by C. V. Sridhar. The film stars S. V. Subbaiah, R. Muthuraman, Chandrakantha and Rajasree, with Nagesh, V. Gopalakrishnan, V. S. Raghavan, Jayanthi and S. N. Lakshmi in supporting roles. It focuses on the rags to riches story of a veena vidwan, whose success is almost derailed when he takes to liquor abuse.

Kalai Kovil was produced under the banner Bhagyalakshmi Productions by M. S. Viswanathan (using the name Visu) and Ganga. Viswanathan also composed the film's soundtrack with T. K. Ramamoorthy under the name Viswanathan–Ramamoorthy, and Ganga also served as the art director. Sridhar's frequent collaborator Chitralaya Gopu served as the film's assistant dialogue writer.

Kalai Kovil was released on 25 September 1964 and received positive reviews from critics for its music, cast performances, writing and direction by Sridhar. It was not commercially successful, but the song "Thangaratham Vanthathu", performed by P. Susheela and M. Balamuralikrishna, attained popularity.

Plot 

An impoverished man rises from rags to riches by becoming a veena vidwan, but almost loses it in the lap of a danseuse and the lavishness of liquor.

Cast 

Male cast
S. V. Subbaiah
R. Muthuraman
Nagesh
V. Gopalakrishnan
V. S. Raghavan

Female cast
Chandrakantha
Rajasree
Jayanthi
S. N. Lakshmi

Production 
After the success of Kadhalikka Neramillai (1964), its producer and director C. V. Sridhar decided to make his next directorial venture based on the life of a musician. His frequent collaborator, writer Chitralaya Gopu met up with him at Marina Beach to discuss their next project which he wanted to be a comedy, but Sridhar told him to listen to the story he already finished writing, the story that became the film Kalai Kovil. Gopu was assigned as the film's assistant dialogue writer. After listening to the story, composer M. S. Viswanathan decided to produce the film along with Ganga under the banner Bhagyalakshmi Productions. Ganga also worked as the art director, while Viswanathan was credited as "Visu" for his role as producer in the posters and opening credits. Cinematography was handled by Balu, and editing by N. M. Shankar. Chitti Babu played the veena offscreen for Muthuraman. S. V. Ranga Rao was Sridhar's initial choice for the lead role; since he did not turn up on the sets on the first day of the shoot, he was replaced with S. V. Subbaiah who initially refused to play the role as he was asked to sport a fake beard which he was not comfortable with but later relented.

Soundtrack 

The soundtrack was composed by Viswanathan–Ramamoorthy (a duo consisting of M. S. Viswanathan and T. K. Ramamoorthy) and the lyrics were penned by Kannadasan. The song "Deviyar Iruvar" is set in the Carnatic raga known as Shree, while "Thangaratham Vanthathu" is set in Abhogi. Shyam was the violinist of the latter song, which attained popularity. He felt diffident in playing the classical-themed song as he was then more comfortable with westernised songs.

Release and reception 
Kalai Kovil was released on 25 September 1964. The film received positive reviews from critics who praised the music, performances of the cast, the screenplay, dialogues and direction by Sridhar. On 2 October 1964, The Indian Express praised the first half, but criticised the second half, saying the film maintained a "richly musical and at times absorbing" tone till the second half, when "scripter-director Sridhar's hands, like that of the hero in the movie, begin to slip". The reviewer called the songs composed by Viswanathan–Ramamoorthy "a delight to the ears", but felt they did not exploit the veena, "the very soul of the film", fully. They also lauded Balu's cinematography, Ganga's art direction and the performances of Subbaiah and Nagesh, saying they "try to salvage the film, but in vain". The film was commercially unsuccessful.

References

Bibliography

External links 
 

1960s Tamil-language films
1964 films
1964 musical films
Films about alcoholism
Films about music and musicians
Films directed by C. V. Sridhar
Films scored by Viswanathan–Ramamoorthy
Films with screenplays by C. V. Sridhar
Indian musical films